The 2009 Italian Figure Skating Championships was held in Turin from December 18 through 21, 2008. Skaters competed in the disciplines of men's singles, ladies' singles, pair skating, and ice dancing on the levels of senior and junior. The results were used to choose the teams to the 2009 World Championships, the 2009 European Championships, and the 2009 World Junior Championships.

Senior results

Men

Ladies

Pairs

Ice dancing

External links
 results

Italian Figure Skating Championships
2008 in figure skating
Italian Figure Skating Championships, 2009
2009 in Italian sport